Coilostylis ciliaris (fringed star orchid), formerly Epidendrum ciliare, is a species of orchid in the genus Coilostylis. It was transferred from Epidendrum by Withner and Harding in 2004.  It is the type species of the genus Coilostylis.

The diploid chromosome number of C. ciliare has been determined from several individuals as 2n = 40, 80, and 160, the haploid chromosome number as n = 20.

The moth Pseudosphinx tetrio has been observed as a pollinator in Puerto Rico.

Footnotes 

ciliaris
Orchids of Îles des Saintes
Orchids of Puerto Rico
Plants described in 1759
Taxa named by Carl Linnaeus